Malekabad, Lorestan may refer to:
Malekabad, Borujerd
Malekabad, Delfan
Malekabad, Qaleh-ye Mozaffari, Selseleh County
Malekabad, Yusefvand, Selseleh County